CBI-FM is a Canadian radio station, which broadcasts the programming of the CBC Music network in Sydney, Nova Scotia. The station airs at 105.1 FM.

History
CBI-FM originally launched on August 28, 1978, at 105.9 FM, until it changed to its current frequency in 1984.

References

External links
CBC Nova Scotia
 

BI
BI
Radio stations established in 1977
1977 establishments in Nova Scotia